Mademoiselle V. in the Costume of an Espada is an 1862 painting by Édouard Manet, now in the Metropolitan Museum of Art. Manet exhibited the painting with Déjeuner sur l'herbe and Young Man Dressed as a Majo at the Salon des Refusés in 1863. The subject of the painting is Victorine Meurent, dressed as a bullfighter.

References

1862 paintings
Paintings by Édouard Manet
Paintings in the collection of the Metropolitan Museum of Art
Bullfighting in art